Rafalus desertus is a species of jumping spider in the genus Rafalus that lives in the United Arab Emirates. It was first described in 2010.

References

Salticidae
Spiders of Asia
Spiders described in 2010